One Blood is the fifth studio album by Australian group, Yothu Yindi that was released internationally in 1998 via Epic Records and in Australia in July 1999. The album peaked at number 43 on the ARIA charts.

The album saw the travel overseas and work with different musicians and in different studios, re-recording some of their earlier hits.

Track listing
 "Laykarrambu" (Traditional song, arranged by Mandawuy Yunupingu, Yomunu Yunupingu)
 "One Blood" (M. Yunupingu, P. Kelly)
 "Mainstream" (M. Yunupingu) (featuring Liam O'Maonlai)
 "World Turning" (M. Yunupingu, Witiyana Marika)
 "Baywara" (M. Yunupingu, Stuart Kellaway)
 "Dots on the Shells" (M. Yunupingu, Neil Finn) (featuring Jim Kerr)
 "Rrama" (Traditional song, arranged by Galarrwuy Yunupingu, Milkayngu Mununggurr)
 "Djäpana (Sunset Dreaming)" (M. Yunupingu)
 "Written on a Bark" (M. Yunupingu, Kellaway)
 "Tribal Voice" (M. Yunupingu)
 "7 Sisters" (M. Yunupingu)
 "Minga Minga" (Traditional song, arranged by M. Yunupingu, Y. Yunupingu)
 "Tears for Law (Garrathiya Run)" (M. Yunupingu, Daniel Watson)
 "Baru" (Traditional song, arranged by G. Yunupingu, Mununggurr)
 "Belief in the Future" (Kellaway, M.G. Yunupingu, C. Holt)
 "Nyinga Nyinga" (Traditional song, arranged by G. Yunupingu, Mununggurr)
 "Our Land" (M. Yunupingu, Kellaway)
 "Yarryurru" (Traditional song, arranged by G. Yunupingu, Mununggurr)
 "Treaty 98" (M. Yunupingu, G. Yunupingu, Mununggurr, Marika, Kellaway, Cal Williams, Kelly, Peter Garrett)

Charts

Release history

References

Yothu Yindi albums
1998 albums
Mushroom Records albums